Rony Agustinus (born 7 October 1978) is an Indonesian former badminton player, who now works as a badminton coach. As a junior player, he represented his country at the 1996 World Junior Championships and won the bronze medal in the boys' singles event. In 1997, he finished as a semi-finalist at the French and Indonesia International tournaments. He took the silver medal at the 2000 Asian Championships but was defeated by his teammate Taufik Hidayat in the final. In 2001, he reached the final of the 2001 Malaysia Open as an unseeded player, defeating a former All England champion Pullela Gopichand of India, his compatriot Hendrawan, the world champion, Park Tae-sang of South Korea, and Chen Hong of China en route to the final. He failed to win the title after he lost to host player Ong Ewe Hock. Agustinus played at the 2002 Busan Asian Games, and helped the team win the silver medal. He was also part of the national team that won the 2002 Thomas Cup.

Agustinus started his career as a coach in Indonesia, and was Malaysia national coach from 2013-2019. Currently he is a coach for South Korea national men's and women's single team.

Achievements

Asian Championships 
Men's singles

Southeast Asian Games 
Men's singles

World Junior Championships 
Boys' singles

IBF Grand Prix 
The World Badminton Grand Prix was sanctioned by the International Badminton Federation from 1983 to 2006.

Men's singles

References

External links 
 

1978 births
Living people
Indonesian male badminton players
Badminton players at the 2002 Asian Games
Asian Games silver medalists for Indonesia
Asian Games medalists in badminton
Medalists at the 2002 Asian Games
Competitors at the 1999 Southeast Asian Games
Competitors at the 2001 Southeast Asian Games
Southeast Asian Games gold medalists for Indonesia
Southeast Asian Games silver medalists for Indonesia
Southeast Asian Games bronze medalists for Indonesia
Southeast Asian Games medalists in badminton
Badminton coaches
21st-century Indonesian people
Indonesian expatriate sportspeople in South Korea